The Matla (Persian/Arabic/Urdu:) is the first sher, or couplet, of a ghazal, a collection of poems in Urdu or Persian poetry. It is possible, although extremely rare, for there to be more than one matla in a ghazal; in this case the second is referred to as matla-e-sani, literally the second matla. It is important part because it establishes the overall form and mood of the entire ghazal. 

The defining feature of the matla is that both verses of the couplet rhyme, or expressed in technical terminology, both verses end with the qaafiyaa and radif of the ghazal. In fact, the purpose of the matla is to define the qaafiya and radif for the rest of the ghazal.

References 

Ghazal
Urdu-language poetry